Cowley is a small dispersed hamlet in North East Derbyshire, consisting of a few private houses and functioning farms strung out along Cowley Lane, which runs between the village of Holmesfield and the "Hill Top" neighbourhood of the town of Dronfield (where the population is included). Until 2001 it held an annual well dressing in the grounds of Cowley Mission, a small chapel founded in 1888 and still active.

History
Cowley is mentioned in the Domesday book as belonging to Henry de Ferrers and being worth ten shillings. Henry was given a large number of manors in Derbyshire including Doveridge, Breaston, Duffield and Hartshorne.

The name Cowley has been described as coming from two Old English words, col for coal or earlier charcoal and leah for clearing, suggesting the charcoal burners' clearing. Coal (the Silkstone seam) is close to the surface in this area and has been worked for centuries, though no longer. Early coal workings would have been shallow, probably bell pits; the nearest, deeper shaft marked on the Ordnance Survey map is about 800 m north of Cowley at SK337778, on the edge of modern Dronfield.

References

External links

Hamlets in Derbyshire
North East Derbyshire District